Teita mabuya may refer to:

 Trachylepis keroanensis 
 Trachylepis perrotetii, otherwise known as African red-sided skink

See also
Skink

Animal common name disambiguation pages